is a Japanese footballer who plays as a goalkeeper for TIAMO Hirakata. He also holds Irish citizenship.

Career
Killoran made his professional debut for Tokyo Verdy on 26 July 2014, playing the full ninety minutes in a 1–1 draw with Matsumoto Yamaga.

Personal life
Killoran was born in Tokyo to a Japanese mother and Irish father. His twin brother Colin is also a professional footballer.

Career statistics

Club

References

External links
 

1992 births
Living people
Association football people from Tokyo
Japanese footballers
J1 League players
J2 League players
Tokyo Verdy players
Giravanz Kitakyushu players
Matsumoto Yamaga FC players
Japanese people of Irish descent
Japanese twins
Twin sportspeople
Association football goalkeepers